Pablo Siebel (born December 1954 in Santiago de Chile) is a Chilean painter. He has garnered more than 60 individual and group exhibitions, as well as placements in museums, public and private collections, including the Sala José Saramago in Madrid, Spain.

Background
Siebel moved with his family to Europe in 1970. Following a sojourn in his father's native Germany, in 1971 the family finally settled in Spain.

In Madrid, Siebel concurrently studied law and art. While he obtained his law degree from the Universidad Complutense, he never practiced his father's chosen profession. Instead, he opted to follow his personal like for art.

Individual exhibitions
1980 O.C.I. Kitzbühel, Austria
1981 Galeria El Claustro, Santiago, Chile
1983 Galeria Anais, Munich, Alemania
1983 BfG Galerie, Regensburg, Alemania
1983 Canning House, Londres, Gran Bretaña
1984 Galeria Seiquer, Madrid, España
1985 Galerie Berthe, Bargteheide, Alemania
1986 Galería Plástica 3, Santiago, Chile
1987 Galerie Hartmann, Frankfurt, Alemania
1987 Galerie Ruchti, Colonia, Alemania
1989 Galerie Kampl, Munich, Alemania
1987 Galerie Ruchti, Colonia, Alemania
1987 La Galería, Santiago, Chile
1994 Musero de Salamanca, Salamanca, España
1995 Galería Arte Giani, Frankfurt, Alemania
1995 Sala de exposiciones de la Biblioteca de Castilla y León, Valladolid, España
1995 Galería Coscoja, Segovia, España
1996 Galería Montalbán, Madrid, España
1996 Casa de la Cultura de El Espartal, Madrid, España
1997 Galería Arte Giani, Frankfurt, Alemania
1997 Centro Cultural Las Dehesillas, Leganés, Madrid, España
1997 Galería Arte Actual la Dehesa, Santiago, Chile
1997 Museo de Arte Contemporáneo, Santiago, Chile
1998 Galerie Differente, Hamburgo, Alemania
1998 Stadthausgalerie Hamm, Alemania
1999 Galería Ángela Sacritán, Madrid, España
2001 Centro Cultural Recoleta, Buenos Aires, Argentina
2001 "Flores y Fantasmas", Sala La Escondida, Embajada de Chile, Berlín, Alemania
2002 Haus Opherdicke, Kreis Unna, Alemania
2003 Galerie Wagner, Zürich, Switzerland
2003 Cassis, New York, USA

References

External links 
 

Living people
1954 births
20th-century Chilean painters
Chilean male artists
21st-century painters
Chilean male painters
Male painters
20th-century Chilean male artists